The Athens Tram is a modern tram system that serves the Greek capital of Athens. The current system is operated by STASY, who also manages the Athens Metro, and is part of the Transport for Athens network.

The initial network opened on 19 July 2004, a few weeks prior to the 2004 Summer Olympics in Athens, and was the first since the closure of the original system in October 1960, and the Piraeus-Perama light railway in April 1977. The initial network consisted of three branches, each of them reaching Syntagma to the north, Kolymvitirio to the south, and Stadio Irinis & Filias (SEF) to the west. The system later saw extensions to Asklipiio Voulas in November 2007, Gipedo Karaiskaki in November 2019, and then Agia Triada via the Piraeus loop in December 2021.

Since December 2021, the system consists of 59 tram stops: one additional stop, Akti Poseidonos on the western end of the Piraeus branch, is complete but not yet open. A majority of the stops are within the South and Central Athens regional units: thirteen are in Piraeus, and one is in Voula, an Athenian suburb in the East Attica regional unit. There are many proposals to extend the Athens Tram, but because many of the stops associated with the proposals are unconfirmed, they are not included here until construction begins.



Current tram stops 

Unless indicated, the spelling of the tram stop names on this table, in English and Greek, are according to the signage.

Stops on the Piraeus branch 

The following is a list of tram stops on the Piraeus branch, from the junction of Poseidonos Avenue and Achilleos to Omiridou Skylitsi, via the Piraeus loop.

Services on this branch were suspended from 16 March 2020 to 21 January 2021, due to realignment works associated with the Faliro Waterfront regeneration project: Tzitzifies, Kallithea and Moschato were also rebuilt during the realignment works.

Stops on the Syntagma branch 

The following is a list of tram stops on the Syntagma branch, from the junction of Poseidonos Avenue and Achilleos to Syntagma.

The branch was cut back to Kassomouli from 19 October 2018 to 20 November 2020, due to concerns over subsidence in the underground riverbed of the Ilisos.

Stops on the Glyfada branch 

The following is a list of tram stops on the Glyfada branch, from the junction of Poseidonos Avenue and Achilleos to Asklipiio Voulas: tram stops between Edem and Kentro Istioploias are located west of Poseidonos Avenue.

Future tram stops 

The following is a list of tram stops that are under construction: proposed tram stops are not included.

One tram stop on the western end of the Piraeus branch, Akti Poseidonos, is not yet open.

See also 

 Rolling stock section of Athens tram
 List of Athens Metro stations

Notes

References 

Athens Tram stops
Greece transport-related lists